BEEM Babol Cultural and Sport Club was an Iranian multisport club based in Babol, Iran.

The club is owned by BEEM (Blitz-Elektro-Erzeugnisse Manufaktur) a German electrical appliance company based in Rosbach vor der Höhe. The Managing Director of the company is Iranian Bijan Mehshat.

Basketball
BEEM competed in 2007–08 and 2008–09 season and respectively finished 8th and 6th.

Notable players
  Kevin Jobity
  Garth Joseph
  Mousa Nabipour
  Pouya Tajik
  Iman Zandi
  Soumaila Samake
  Kevin Jamal Bradley
  Michael Byars-Dawson
  Calvin Cage Jr.
  Chris Cameron
  Ashley Champion
  Waitari Marsh
  Josh Moore

Volleyball
BEEM competed in 2008–09 season and finished 3rd.

Notable players
  Evgeni Ivanov
  Ivan Tassev

External links
BEEM
page on Asia-Basket

Multi-sport clubs in Iran
Sport in Mazandaran Province